Korell is a surname. Notable people with the surname include:

Franklin F. Korell (1889–1965), American attorney and politician
Steffen Korell (born 1971), German football player
 (born 1979), Finnish sprinter
 (born 1968), squash player